Christopher Jenkins is a Welsh powerlifter and strongman. He is a former junior World powerlifting champion and holds Welsh, British, European and World records in the powerlifts. Jenkins has been described as one of the greatest junior powerlifters of all time. In Strongman Chris Jenkins is a two time winner of Wales Strongest Man U90kg.

Early life

Chris Jenkins was raised in Port Talbot and was a pupil at Ysgol Gyfun Gwyr. Jenkins began weight training at age 11 to improve his running at school.  In 1997 he began boxing with the Welsh Boxing Federation now Welsh Boxing Association and holds an amateur record of 7–0. Jenkins also holds a 1st Dan black belt in Wado Ryu karate under the Bushi Kai.

Powerlifting career

Chris Jenkins was coached in his teens, by Welsh Weightlifter Mike Brown at his private home gym in Margam, Port Talbot. Brown also coached double Commonwealth Weightlifting medalist Gareth Hives. 

Jenkins competed in his first British powerlifting championships in 2000, winning the 18/19 teenage class, breaking the British and European senior deadlift record of 282.5 kg at 82.5 kg bodyweight. 

In 2001 he won his first junior world title in Dallas, Texas. Jenkins holds the junior world record deadlift of 331 kg at 90 kg bodyweight and has been described as one of the biggest talents in British Powerlifting.

Jenkins also holds a WR deadlift in the International Strength Association with 352.5 kg (775.5 lbs) set at 90 kg (198 lbs) bodyweight in Fort Worth, Texas in 2007.

Best equipped lifts
 Squat - 821 lbs (~372.5 kg) -2006 BPC British Powerlifting championships. Maidstone, Kent. Age 25, Open division. Muti-ply, 90kg class, weight 88.2kg.
 Bench press - 534 lbs (~235.5 kg) -2009 WPC World Powerlifting championships. Bournemouth, England. Age 29, Open division. Multi-ply, 90kg class, weight 89.9kg.
 Deadlift - 815.71 lbs (~370kg kg) -BPC 2008 UK open championships. Folkestone, England. Age 27, Open division. Multi-ply, 90k class, weight 89.7kg.

Other lifts

Axle press - 363 lbs, (~165 kg) 2013 Giants live contest, Bala, North Wales.

Yoke carry - 800 lbs, (~362.5 kg) 2021 Official Strongman Games, Daytona Beach, Florida

Mugging incident
On 29 January Chris Jenkins managed to foil a purse snatching. A 26-year-old male attacked an 81-year-old lady at the Oxfam store in Port Talbot, taking her bag and purse. Taken from the South Wales Evening post "Mr Jenkins used a judo throw to floor the suspect and stayed with him until the police arrived".

References

Living people
British powerlifters
Year of birth missing (living people)
Welsh male weightlifters
Sportspeople from Neath

Competition Record

British Senior National Championships 
 (18–19) 82.5 kg teenage division
 junior 90 kg division
 junior 90 kg division
 open & junior 90 kg division
 open & junior 90 kg division
 open 90 kg division
 open 90 kg division
 open 90 kg division
 open 82.5 kg division
 open 100 kg  division
 open 100 kg  division
 open 90 kg  division
 open 90 kg  division 
 Junior 90 kg division
 Junior 90 kg division
 junior 90 kg division
 open 90 kg division
 open 90 kg division
 open 82.5 kg division
 open 90 kg division
 open 82.5 kg  division

 open 100 kg division
 open 100 kg division
 open 82.5 kg  division
 open 82.5 kg  division